Royal Samuel Copeland (November 7, 1868June 17, 1938), a United States Senator from New York from 1923 until 1938, was an academic, homeopathic physician, and politician. He held elected offices in both Michigan (as a Republican) and New York (as a Democrat).

Early life and medical career
Born in Dexter, Michigan, to parents Roscoe P. Copeland and Frances J. Holmes, Royal Copeland graduated from Dexter High School and attended Michigan State Normal College (now Eastern Michigan University). In 1888, he taught school in Sylvan Township, Michigan.

He graduated in 1889 from the University of Michigan in Ann Arbor with a degree in medicine. After graduate studies in Europe, Copeland practiced medicine in Bay City, Michigan, from 1890 to 1895. Copeland was admitted to the Homeopathy Society of Michigan on May 21, 1890, and was made secretary of the society in October 1893. He was a professor of Ophthalmology and Otology in the University of Michigan Medical School's Homeopathic Department from 1895 until 1908.

Political career in Michigan
During his time as a medical professor in Ann Arbor, Copeland was active in municipal politics. A Republican, he served as mayor of Ann Arbor from 1901 to 1903.  He was president of the Ann Arbor Board of Education from 1907 to 1908. He also served for several years as president of the Ann Arbor Board of Park Commissioners.

New York
On July 15, 1908, Copeland married Frances Spalding. The same year, Copeland moved to New York City to take a position as dean at the New York Homeopathic Medical College and Flower Hospital. Copeland left his position as dean in 1918 in order to serve as President of the New York City Board of Health. He was appointed to this position by Mayor John Hylan in May 1918.

In September 28, Copeland acknowledged that the Spanish flu outbreak was seriously impacting the city, and possibly an epidemic. However, he decided to permit motion picture theaters to remain open. He considered closing the theaters to have little effect in reducing the epidemic as long as the crowded transportation lines continued to operate. Copeland also left the city's schools open, arguing it was better, "to have the children under the constant observation of qualified persons than to close the schools". New York City, Chicago and New Haven, Connecticut were the notable exceptions of most cities closing their own schools during the epidemic.

During the epidemic, Copeland organized a system of emergency health districts to provide localized care. If individuals who lived in apartments or private residences contracted the virus, they were quarantined and care was provided to them in their house. However, if individuals who lived in tenements or boarding houses contracted the virus, they were moved to city hospitals.

Copeland served a total of five terms of the New York City Board of Health, before taking office as a United States Senator in 1923.

United States Senate
In 1922, Copeland ran as a Democrat for the U.S. Senate, defeating first-term Republican Senator William M. Calder. Franklin D. Roosevelt served as his honorary campaign manager for this election.  Copeland was re-elected in 1928 over Republican challenger Alanson B. Houghton, the U.S. Ambassador to Britain and a former U.S. Representative. Copeland was again re-elected in 1934, this time defeating future U.S. Congressman E. Harold Cluett.

During his three terms in the Senate, Copeland served as chairman of the U.S. Senate Committee on Rules and Administration from 1933 to 1936 and chairman of the Committee on Commerce from 1935 to 1938. In 1935-1936 Copeland served as Chairman of the highly controversial Copeland Committee, which gave a scathing review of air traffic safety and the operation of the Bureau of Air Commerce. Copeland served as primary author and sponsor of the Federal Food, Drug, and Cosmetic Act of 1938 which entrenched special protections for homeopaths.  He was the primary sponsor of the Copeland "Anti-kickback" Act, which targeted kickbacks to federal contractors, subcontractors and officials from construction employees.

Copeland was close to the regular Democratic organization in New York, the boss-led Tammany Hall. He was a conservative Democrat and not especially supportive of the New Deal policies of his fellow New Yorker, Franklin Roosevelt. He was also a friend of Harry S. Truman when they both served in the U.S. Senate. Copeland was known for his successful efforts to bring air conditioning to the Senate.

In July 1937, Copeland proposed two rider amendments to the Interstate Commerce Act which would add an anti-lynching bill to the legislation. Both failed to pass due to the majority of Senate Democrats voting to table them.

In 1937 he lost the Democratic nomination for Mayor of New York City to Judge Jeremiah T. Mahoney, and the Republican nomination to incumbent Republican Mayor Fiorello LaGuardia.

Death
Copeland died at his apartment in Washington, DC on June 17, 1938. According to news reports, he died of a circulatory collapse brought on by overwork during the longer than usual Senate session that ended on the day of his death.  His funeral was at his home in Suffern, New York.  He was buried at Mahwah Cemetery in Mahwah, New Jersey.

Election results

!bgcolor=#CCCCCC |Year
!bgcolor=#CCCCCC |Office
!
!bgcolor=#CCCCCC |Subject
!bgcolor=#CCCCCC |Party
!bgcolor=#CCCCCC |Votes
!bgcolor=#CCCCCC |Portion
!
!bgcolor=#CCCCCC |Opponent
!bgcolor=#CCCCCC |Party
!bgcolor=#CCCCCC |Votes
!bgcolor=#CCCCCC |Portion
|-
|1922
|U.S. Senator (Class 1) from New York
|
|bgcolor=#DDEEFF |Royal S. Copeland
|bgcolor=#DDEEFF |Democratic
|bgcolor=#DDEEFF |1,276,667
|bgcolor=#DDEEFF |49.5%
|
|bgcolor=#FFE8E8 |William M. Calder
|bgcolor=#FFE8E8 |Republican
|bgcolor=#FFE8E8 |995,421
|bgcolor=#FFE8E8 |38.6%
|-
|1928
|U.S. Senator (Class 1) from New York
|
|bgcolor=#DDEEFF |Royal S. Copeland
|bgcolor=#DDEEFF |Democratic
|bgcolor=#DDEEFF |2,084,273
|bgcolor=#DDEEFF |46.7%
|
|bgcolor=#FFE8E8 |Alanson B. Houghton
|bgcolor=#FFE8E8 |Republican
|bgcolor=#FFE8E8 |2,034,014
|bgcolor=#FFE8E8 |45.6%
|-
|1934
|U.S. Senator (Class 1) from New York
|
|bgcolor=#DDEEFF |Royal S. Copeland
|bgcolor=#DDEEFF |Democratic
|bgcolor=#DDEEFF |2,046,377
|bgcolor=#DDEEFF |52.0%
|
|bgcolor=#FFE8E8 |E. Harold Cluett
|bgcolor=#FFE8E8 |Republican
|bgcolor=#FFE8E8 |1,363,440
|bgcolor=#FFE8E8 |34.7%
|-
|rowspan="2"|1937
|Democratic nomination for Mayor of New York City
|
|bgcolor=#DDEEFF |Royal S. Copeland
|bgcolor=#DDEEFF |Democratic
|bgcolor=#DDEEFF |c. 200,000
|bgcolor=#DDEEFF |2/5
|
|bgcolor=#DDEEFF |Jeremiah T. Mahoney
|bgcolor=#DDEEFF |Democratic
|bgcolor=#DDEEFF |c. 400,000
|bgcolor=#DDEEFF |3/5
|-
|Republican nomination for Mayor of New York City
|
|bgcolor=#FFE8E8 |Royal S. Copeland
|bgcolor=#FFE8E8 |
|bgcolor=#FFE8E8 |
|bgcolor=#FFE8E8 | 1/3
|
|bgcolor=#FFE8E8 |Fiorello H. LaGuardia
|bgcolor=#FFE8E8 |Republican
|bgcolor=#FFE8E8 |
|bgcolor=#FFE8E8 | 2/3
|-

Honors and society memberships

Copeland was a member of several honor societies and fraternal organizations, including the  Pi Gamma Mu international honor society in social sciences, which he served in various positions, Delta Kappa Epsilon, the New York Athletic Club, the National Democratic Club, the Elks, the Freemasons, the Knights Templar, the Shriners, the Friendly Sons of St. Patrick, the Sons of the American Revolution and the Eugenics Committee of the United States of America.

At various times Copeland served as President, Vice President, and Secretary of the Michigan Homeopathic Society; President of the American Ophthalmological, Otological, and Laryngological Society; President American Institute of Homeopathy; Vice President of the American Public Health Association; Member of the National Board of Control of Epworth League; President of the Michigan Epworth League; member of the Tuberculosis Commission of Michigan; trustee of Michigan State Tuberculosis Sanitarium; and he was elected three times to the General Conference of the Methodist Episcopal Church.

Publications

See also 
 List of United States Congress members who died in office (1900–49)

References

External links 

 
 Mayors of Ann Arbor page at PoliticalGraveyard.com
 
 
 Royal S. Copeland recordings at the Discography of American Historical Recordings.

Mayors of Ann Arbor, Michigan
Burials in New Jersey
New York (state) Democrats
University of Michigan faculty
1868 births
1938 deaths
Eastern Michigan University alumni
Sons of the American Revolution
Democratic Party United States senators from New York (state)
Michigan Republicans
University of Michigan Medical School alumni
People from Dexter, Michigan
American homeopaths
Commissioners of Health of the City of New York
20th-century American politicians
Old Right (United States)
Deaths from circulatory collapse